Ade Adebisi (born 1 July 1986), also known by the nickname of "London Flyer", is a British rugby league footballer.

Adebisi suffers from the genetic blood disorder sickle-cell disease and is the only known rugby player ever to play professionally with the condition. He is an ambassador for the Sickle Cell Society and the founder of the Ade Adebisi Sickle Cell Foundation.
Adebisi also leads the Nigeria rugby league revolution as general manager/vice chairman. The former professional spent two years between 2017 and 2019 working to get the African nation involved with the 13-a-side code for no money. Under his leadership, Nigeria was chosen to host the Middle East Africa rugby league championship in October 2019.

Playing career

London Broncos
In 2002, Adebisi, a promising schoolboy athlete and footballer joined the London Broncos development programme before signing up for their junior academy team the following season. In 2004, as well as representing the BARLA Young Lions against France, he also made his debut for London in Super League. Limited opportunities at senior level led to a spell on loan to Hull F.C. where he played in their successful 2005 academy side.

Doncaster Lakers & Featherstone
His association with the London club ended in 2007, when he signed initially for Doncaster before moving to Featherstone for the last 11 games of the season.

His first year at the Recre was a great success and he finished the season as the club's top try scorer. Together with teammate Craig Calvert, Haven had two of the most potent wingmen in the Championship.

Whitehaven RLFC
In 2008, he joined Whitehaven R.L.F.C. from the 2007 National League Two winning side, Featherstone Rovers. While at Whitehaven R.L.F.C., he was their top try scorer in 2008, with 22 tries in 30 games.

London Skolars
In 2010, Adebisi returned to London Skolars, following his release by Whitehaven, scoring 51 tries in 66 games through to 2013.

Retirement

In 2014, following a struggle with injuries and sickle cell disease, Adebisi retired from playing professional rugby league.

Personal life
On 30 June 2018 Adebisi married his long time partner, Nigerian chef Jennifer Adebisi. Together they have a son, Myles Kobimra Ade Adebisi (born 23 June 2019).

References

External links
 
Ade Adebisi at youtube.com
Ade Adebisi at facebook.com

1986 births
Living people
Doncaster R.L.F.C. players
English people of Nigerian descent
English people of Yoruba descent
English rugby league players
Featherstone Rovers players
London Broncos players
London Skolars players
Rugby league fullbacks
Rugby league wingers
Whitehaven R.L.F.C. players
Yoruba sportspeople